Gary Evans (born 21 October 1960) is a British former racing driver.

Racing record

Complete International Formula 3000 results
(key) (Races in bold indicate pole position; races in italics indicate fastest lap.)

References

1960 births
Living people
British racing drivers
International Formula 3000 drivers
British Formula Three Championship drivers
FIA European Formula 3 Championship drivers